Sheila Avilés (born 7 July 1993) is a Spanish female sky runner, who won 2017 & 2019 Skyrunner World Series in Sky Classic.

Biography
In 2017 she won also bronze medal at the Skyrunning European Championships.

World Cup wins

References

External links
Sheila Avilés profile at Corredores de Montaña

1993 births
Living people
Spanish sky runners
Spanish female mountain runners
People from Igualada
Sportspeople from the Province of Barcelona